Nema laži, nema prevare – Uživo, Zagreb '85 (trans. No Lies, No Frauds - Live, Zagreb '85) is the second live album by former Yugoslav and Serbian rock band Riblja Čorba. Originally a bootleg recording of Riblja Čorba concert held in Zagreb on March 3, 1985, Nema laži, nema prevare - Zagreb uživo `85 was released as a live album in 1995 by Slovenian record label Biveco. The recording was not remastered, or edited in any other way for the release. The band has included the album into their official discography.

Track listing
"Draga, ne budi peder" – 4:17
"Dvorska budala" – 3:29
"Rock 'n' Roll za kućni savet" – 4:16
"Neću da ispadnem životinja" – 4:40
"Dva dinara, druže" – 4:34
"Evo ti za taksi" – 2:47
"Egoista" – 2:48
"Hleba i igara" – 3:03
"'Alo" – 3:06
"Prevara" – 4:28
"Kad hodaš" – 4:53
"Sačekaj" – 3:38
"Kako je lepo biti glup" – 4:21
"Džindžer solo" – 3:24
"'Ajde beži" – 4:12
"Odlazak u grad" – 2:16
"Ostaću slobodan" – 2:17
"Volim, volim, volim žene" – 2:47
"Neću da te volim" – 4:14
"Priča o Žiki Živcu" – 3:24

Personnel
Bora Đorđević - vocals
Vidoja Božinović - guitar
Nikola Čuturilo - guitar
Miša Aleksić - bass guitar
Vicko Milatović - drums

References

Nema laži, nema prevare – Uživo, Zagreb `85 at Discogs
 EX YU ROCK enciklopedija 1960-2006,  Janjatović Petar;  
 Riblja čorba,  Jakovljević Mirko;

External links
Nema laži, nema prevare – Uživo, Zagreb `85 at Discogs

1995 live albums
Riblja Čorba live albums